Victoria Thaine (born 4 January 1984) is an Australian television and film actress and former playwright.

Filmography

Film

Television

Other work

Awards
Thaine was nominated at the 2008 Logie Awards for the Most Outstanding Actress category for her role in the drama Rain Shadow.

References 

Australian film actresses
Australian television actresses
Living people
Place of birth missing (living people)
1984 births
University of Wollongong alumni